Seyyed Jalal Hosseini (born 3 February 1982), commonly known as Seyyed Jalal or Jalal Hosseini, is a former Iranian professional footballer who played as a centre-back and was the Captain of Iranian club Persepolis.

He has been a member of Iran's under-23 side as a wild card player on two occasions, in the 2006 and 2010 Asian Games, winning a bronze medal in 2006. Hosseini has represented Iran at the 2007 AFC Asian Cup, 2011 AFC Asian Cup, 2015 AFC Asian Cup and the 2014 FIFA World Cup.

Early life and education
Hosseini was born on 3 February 1982 in Bandar-e Anzali, Gilan Province. He majored in German Studies.

Club career

Saipa

Hosseini moved from Malavan to Saipa in summer 2005. Before that he was link with a move to Piroozi but the move was cancelled. During the 2005–06 season, he was the most consistent player for his club, making 28 full appearances and scoring one goal. He continued his solid performance for Saipa during the 2006–07 season with 26 full appearances and one goal and also won the league. He also played in the AFC Champions League matches for Saipa.

Sepahan
Hosseini signed for Sepahan in summer 2009 and became their regular player for the season. He won the Persian Gulf Cup for three times in a row with Sepahan. After three years and 94 league appearances, Hosseini left the club in 2012 as one of the league's most established centre-backs.

Persepolis
Hosseini signed a one-year contract with Tehran's reds until the end of 2012–13 Season. He extended his contract with Persepolis for one year in February 2013, keeping him in the team till 2014. He was regarded as the Iran Pro League's best defender. He was one of the main players in persepolis' second place league finish in 2014. Hosseini was named the best defender in the 2013–14 season.

Al-Ahli
On 17 July 2014, Hosseini joined Qatar Stars League's Al-Ahli with signing a one-year contract. He left the club in May 2015.

Naft Tehran
Hosseini left Qatar and joined Persian Gulf Pro League runners–up Naft Tehran in the summer of 2015. With Hosseini Naft reached the quarter–finals of the 2015 AFC Champions League. Midway through the season, he and many Naft players and management had disputes with the board as they had not been paid. As a result of this he left the club before the 2016–17 season.

Persepolis 

In spring of 2016, after days of negotiation, Hosseini announced he had signed with his former club Persepolis. Shortly after he was announced as the club captain for the 2016–17 season. He led Persepolis to a consecutive Persian Pro League in which he was an indisputable player and played a big role in team.

Asian Football Confederation website wrote Hosseini was a solid defender for Persepolis.

On 25 June 2022, Hosseini confirmed his retirement from football as a player. He called the decision "difficult" but "right". At this time, with 9 league titles, he is considered the most honorable and unattainable Iranian player in this regard. Varzesh 3, described his retirement as "start of the Superman in a coaching suit", hoping he will start coaching immediately.

International career

Hosseini was a member of Iran U23 national team, participating in the 2006 Asian Games. He debuted for the senior national team in a friendly match against Belarus in February 2007.

Having joined Team Melli again in July 2007, he played in all four of Iran's matches and scored Iran's first goal in its opening match at the 2007 Asian Cup against Uzbekistan.
He was called again for the 2010 FIFA World Cup qualification and 2014 FIFA World Cup qualification matches. He also played in 2011 AFC Asian Cup qualification for Iran and 2015 AFC Asian Cup qualification. He featured in West Asian Football Federation Championship 2010 and 2011 Asian Cup. On 1 June 2014, he was called into Iran's 2014 FIFA World Cup squad by Carlos Queiroz. He was called into Iran's 2015 AFC Asian Cup squad on 30 December 2014 by Carlos Queiroz.
In 2016, Hosseini was selected as one of the top 3 defenders in the world by France Football magazine in the 2018 FIFA World Cup qualification.
In May 2018 he was named in Iran's preliminary squad for the 2018 World Cup in Russia but did not make the final 23. On 1 December 2018, Hosseini announced his retirement from international football.

Player profile

Style of play 

Hosseini is widely regarded as one of the greatest defenders in history of Iranian football. Also he is the most decorated player in Iranian football league. His tactical awareness and athleticism, intelligent positioning, and aggressive playing style, led the team in defensive positions.

High running rate, fighting and cutting power and excellent leadership are the features of Hosseini's style of play. He is also mentioned as a player who respected the legacy of the Persepolis club, that is, ethics in sports.

Career statistics

Club

International

Scores and results list Iran's goal tally first, score column indicates score after each Hosseini goal.

Honours

Saipa
Persian Gulf Pro League: 2006–07

Sepahan
Persian Gulf Pro League: 2009–10, 2010–11, 2011–12

Persepolis
Persian Gulf Pro League: 2016–17, 2017–18, 2018–19, 2019–20, 2020–21
Hazfi Cup: 2018–19
Iranian Super Cup: 2017, 2018, 2019, 2020
AFC Champions League runner-up: 2018, 2020

Iran U23 (Wild card)
Asian Games Bronze Medal: 2006

Individual
Persian Gulf Pro League Defender of the Year (6) : 2006–07, 2007–08, 2013–14, 2015–16, 2016–17, 2017–18, 2018–19
Persian Gulf Pro League Team of the Year : 2013–14, 2015–16, 2016–17, 2017–18, 2018–19
Navad Player of the Month: November 2017, December 2017
AFC Champions League OPTA Best XI: 2018
 Iran's AFC Champions League Legend

See also
 List of men's footballers with 100 or more international caps

References

External links

Jalal Hosseini  at PersianLeague.com
Jalal Hosseini at TeamMelli.com

1982 births
Living people
Iranian footballers
Association football central defenders
Iran international footballers
Azadegan League players
Qatar Stars League players
Malavan players
Sepahan S.C. footballers
Saipa F.C. players
Persepolis F.C. players
2007 AFC Asian Cup players
2011 AFC Asian Cup players
2014 FIFA World Cup players
2015 AFC Asian Cup players
Asian Games bronze medalists for Iran
Al Ahli SC (Doha) players
Asian Games medalists in football
Footballers at the 2006 Asian Games
Footballers at the 2010 Asian Games
FIFA Century Club
People from Bandar-e Anzali
Medalists at the 2006 Asian Games
Persian Gulf Pro League players
Iranian expatriate footballers
Iranian expatriate sportspeople in Qatar
Expatriate footballers in Qatar
Sportspeople from Gilan province